Allium brulloi is a plant species of wild onion from the family Amaryllidaceae, described originally by Cristina Salmeri in 1998. This is a flowering plant native to the calcareous rocks of Astipalaia, Greece, a SE Aegean island.

No subspecies are listed in the Catalog of Life.

References

brulloi
Flora of Greece
Onions
Plants described in 1998